The Staib Helicopter is a homebuilt aircraft design of Wilbur Staib.

Design and development
Wilbur Staib (1914-1993) was a self-taught aircraft designer from Diamond, Missouri. Staib served as a flight instructor during the Second World War at Chanute, Kansas flying PT-14's. Staib designed and built five different "LB" (Little Bastard) aircraft and a helicopter, of which several had the title "world's smallest" at their time of construction. Staib flew his aircraft in airshows with the title "The Diamond Wizard".

The Staib Helicopter is a powered by a Continental C85 with a V-belt linkage. The gearbox is sourced from a Ford Model A, the clutch from a Studebaker, the rotors cut down from a Brantly B-2 and cooling system from a Chevrolet Corvair. Four different rotor heads were tested.

Operational history
The prototype was flown tethered with a  engine then upgraded to an  engine.

Specifications (Staib Helicopter)

References

Homebuilt aircraft
Single-engined piston helicopters
1970s United States helicopters